Songs We Sing is an album by singer/songwriter Matt Costa. It was originally released on July 26, 2005, and then re-released with a new track list by Brushfire Records on March 28, 2006.

2005 independent release
Songs We Sing was originally released independently by Venerable Media in 2005 and offered a slightly different track list than the Brushfire Records version. This version of the album is currently unavailable. For a time it was available at CD Baby, but they have now permanently sold out.
Songs from this release that were not re-released on the Brushfire Records version include: "Desire's Only Fling", "Whiskey & Wine", and "Shimmering Fields".

Track listing

2006 Brushfire Records release
Songs We Sing was re-released in 2006 by Brushfire Records, owned by fellow musician Jack Johnson and his wife. The album featured new songs and a different track list.
Songs from this release that were not on the 2005 release include; "These Arms", "I Tried", "Ballad of Miss Kate", and "Sweet Thursday".

Some European releases include "Lullaby" as a bonus track. This song, along with the other four mentioned above, were previously released on The Elasmosaurus EP.

Revised track listing

Personnel
Matt Costa – vocals, electric guitar, acoustic guitar, bass, piano

Additional personnel
Andrew Alekel – engineering, mixing on tracks 3 and 10
Brent Arnold – cello on track 13
Robert Carranza – production on "Lullaby", engineering on "Lullaby", mixing on "Lullaby"
Dave Collins – mastering on all tracks
Tom Dumont – electric guitar on track 1, bass on track 5, production on all tracks
Phil Ek – engineering, mixing on tracks 1, 2, 4, 5, 6, 7, 8, 9, 11, 12 and 13
Jack Johnson – vocals on "Lullaby", guitar on "Lullaby", ukulele on "Lullaby", production on "Lullaby"
Jen Kozel – violin on track 13
Ted Matson – piano on tracks 5 and 10,  engineering
Gabrial McNair – harpsichord on track 2
Bob Thompson – bass on tracks 1 and 3
Mitchell Townsend – electric guitar on tracks 1, 3, 5 and 6, bass on tracks 6 and 11, lap steel guitar on track 9
Cameron Webb – engineering
Adrian Young – drums on track 11
Adam Zuckert – drums on tracks 1, 3, 5, 6, 7, 8 and 12

References

2005 albums
Matt Costa albums